Doctor Sleep is a 2019 American supernatural horror film written and directed by Mike Flanagan. It is based on the 2013 Stephen King novel of the same name, and is a sequel to Stanley Kubrick's The Shining (1980). Set several decades after the events of its predecessor, the film stars Ewan McGregor as Danny Torrance, a man with psychic abilities who struggles with childhood trauma. Rebecca Ferguson, Kyliegh Curran, and Cliff Curtis have supporting roles.

Warner Bros. Pictures began developing a film adaptation shortly after Doctor Sleep was published in 2013. Writer-producer Akiva Goldsman wrote a script, but the studio did not secure a budget for the film until the box office success of its 2017 horror film It, also based on a novel by King. Flanagan was hired to rewrite Goldsman's script and direct the Doctor Sleep film. Flanagan said he wanted to reconcile the differences between The Shining novel and film. Filming began in September 2018 in Georgia, including Atlanta and the surrounding area, and concluded that December.

Doctor Sleep held its world premiere at the Regency Village Theater in Los Angeles on October 21, 2019, and was theatrically released worldwide on October 31, 2019, and in the United States on November 8. The film received lukewarm reviews from critics, who praised Flanagan's screenplay and the performances of the cast (especially McGregor, Ferguson, and Curran) but criticized its length. Grossing $72.3 million worldwide, its performance at the box office was considered a disappointment compared to the other King adaptations released in 2019, It Chapter Two and Pet Sematary.

Plot 

Dan Torrance, still traumatized from his family's 1980 ordeal at the Overlook Hotel, is guided by the ghost of Dick Hallorann to capture the ghosts of the Overlook in lockboxes. By 2011, he has become an alcoholic to suppress his shining. After moving to a New Hampshire town, he recovers through Alcoholics Anonymous set up by his new friend Billy Freeman and becomes a hospice orderly, where he uses his shining to comfort dying patients, who nickname him "Doctor Sleep". Meanwhile, the True Knot, a cult of psychics led by Rose the Hat, extend their lifespans by consuming "steam", a psychic essence released by torturing and killing those who have the shining.

In 2019, the True Knots are starving, as steam has become increasingly rare. They torture a boy to death for steam; a young girl named Abra Stone, whose shining is even greater than Dan's, senses this. She telepathically alerts Dan about the murder, but Rose senses Abra in the process. Rose projects her consciousness across the country and infiltrates Abra's mind, but is physically injured by a psychic trap set by Abra. Rose sends the remaining members after her for steam.

Abra informs Dan about the True Knot. Although he is initially skeptical about stopping them, he changes his mind and recruits Billy and Abra's father, Dave, to help. They successfully kill most of the group except Rose, but Billy and Dave are killed and Abra is captured by Rose's partner, Crow Daddy. Dan shines into Abra and saves her from Crow Daddy, killing him in the process. Dan brings Abra to the Overlook as a last resort, believing it will be equally dangerous for Rose. He starts the hotel's boiler and explores the dormant building, "awakening" it with his shining. At the same time, he has visions of his time at the hotel.

Rose arrives at the Overlook and overpowers Dan in a fight, but he saves himself by opening lockboxes in his mind and releasing the Overlook's ghosts. Drawn by Rose's power, the ghosts overwhelm and devour her before turning on Danny and possessing him in a bid to try and make him kill Abra. After a brief moment where she cuts through his possessed mind, he tells her to save herself before the hotel overcomes him again. He goes to the boiler room but regains control before the hotel can make him deactivate it. Before he passes out, Dan sees a vision of himself as a child being comforted by his mother, Wendy. Abra escapes as the Overlook burns down and the authorities arrive.

Sometime later, Abra speaks to Dan's spirit, assuring him that she is fine. Dan comforts Abra, telling her to "shine on" and not to hide her gifts from the world. She shares to her mother that she has been conversing with Dan and her deceased father and that they are okay. Abra later encounters Mrs. Massey, the ghost of the bathroom in the Overlook's Room 237, in her bathtub; she confronts it and closes the door behind her.

Cast

 Ewan McGregor as Danny Torrance, an alcoholic man with psychic powers known as "the shining". Roger Dale Floyd plays a young Danny Torrance.
 The character first appeared as his young self and in the film The Shining; where he was played by Danny Lloyd, who, in this film, makes a cameo appearance as a spectator at Bradley Trevor's baseball game. Lloyd had been retired from acting for roughly 38 years and was direct-messaged on Twitter by Flanagan to appear in the film. Producer Trevor Macy said of Lloyd's involvement, "[Lloyd] was excited to do [the cameo]. He hadn't acted since [the original]. He's a schoolteacher, and a very successful one at that, like making the world better. He came back for a day, and we were thrilled to have him." When pressed as to why the filmmakers did not extend the same offer to Jack Nicholson, Macy responded, "With Jack, I knew that they approached him for Ready Player One, and that he seems to be very serious about being retired. I had known that he was supportive [of the sequel] but retired."
 Rebecca Ferguson as Rose the Hat, leader of the True Knot, a cult that feeds on people with psychic powers.
 Kyliegh Curran as Abra Stone, a girl with "the shining".
Dakota Hickman plays a young Abra Stone.
 Carl Lumbly as Dick Hallorann, the late head chef of the Overlook Hotel who has "the shining". Dick was played by Scatman Crothers in The Shining.
 Zahn McClarnon as Crow Daddy, Rose the Hat's lover and right-hand man in the True Knot. 
 Emily Alyn Lind as Snakebite Andi, a young member of the True Knot who is able to psychically control people.
 Bruce Greenwood as Dr. John Dalton, leader of Dan's AA group and his boss at the hospice.
 Jocelin Donahue as Lucy Stone, Abra's mother.
 Cliff Curtis as Billy Freeman, Dan's friend, coworker, and AA sponsor
 Robert Longstreet as Barry the Chunk, a member of the True Knot.
 Carel Struycken as Grandpa Flick, an aging member of the True Knot.
 Alex Essoe as Wendy Torrance, Dan's mother. Wendy was played by Shelley Duvall in The Shining.
 Zackary Momoh as Dave Stone, Abra's father.
 Jacob Tremblay as Bradley Trevor, a victim of the True Knot, known to Abra as the "baseball boy".
 Henry Thomas as The Bartender, an apparition who calls himself Lloyd but resembles Dan's late father, Jack Torrance; Thomas thus also portrays Torrance briefly in flashback scenes. In The Shining, Torrance was portrayed by Jack Nicholson and Lloyd was portrayed by Joe Turkel.

Additionally, Catherine Parker appears as Silent Sarey, Met Clark as Short Eddie, Selena Anduze as Apron Annie, and James Flanagan as Diesel Doug, all members of the True Knot cult. Violet McGraw portrays Violet, a child who is murdered at the start of the film by the True Knot cult and later fed to Snakebite Andi as part of her induction into the group, while Bethany Anne Lind portrays Violet's mother. Sadie and KK Heim portray the Grady sisters, with Kaitlyn McCormick and Molly Jackson providing their voices; the characters were originally played by twins Lisa and Louise Burns in The Shining. Sallye Hooks portrays Mrs. Massey, Michael Monks portrays Delbert Grady, and Hugh Maguire portrays Horace Derwent, respectively; played by Lia Beldam and Billie Gibson, Philip Stone, and Norman Gay in The Shining.

Regarding the recast characters, Flanagan explained, "We explored everything, and there were only really two options as I saw it: It was either going to be something that was performed, or something that was digital. And even if we had Nicholson come back, based on the rules of the hotel and how the ghosts appear with respect to their age, he'd be performing the part through a digital avatar." Flanagan said that de-aging and digital actors, while improving rapidly, were still inadequate. "The idea of having a digital Danny Torrance riding a trike five minutes into the movie, that just seemed like we were making a video game at that point. It felt disrespectful." Noting that any solution would be controversial, the director decided that the best approach "was not to do impressions; it was to find actors who would remind us of those iconic performances, without ever tipping into parody... I just want to be able to tilt people's memories toward those original actors, but then let the characters be their own. I want to cast someone to play Dick Hallorann; I don't want to cast someone to play Scatman Crothers". The idea of casting a Nicholson impersonator as Jack was also considered, as was casting a big-name actor associated with or reminiscent of Nicholson, such as Leonardo DiCaprio or Christian Slater. Nicholson was also invited to make a cameo appearance as another character, but declined.

Themes

Author Stephen King said he wrote Doctor Sleep because he wondered what Danny Torrance would be like as an adult. Flanagan has stated, "Danny is so traumatized by what he's been through, he has no idea how to deal with this," and McGregor added, "Dan Torrance's philosophy early on in the story is not to use the shining. He's drunk to suppress the horrible visitations, the spirits that are from the Overlook Hotel."

Flanagan described The Shining as "very much about addiction, which is doom. It's about annihilation and the destruction of a family," while Doctor Sleep was about "recovery," stating, "In the way that addiction feels like doom and annihilation, recovery is rebirth, and recovery is salvation, in a way." On themes, Flanagan has stated that “(‘Doctor Sleep’) incorporates a lot of nostalgia from the first film... It also brings in themes that weren’t in the first book, and focuses a lot more on the aspects of addiction and recovery.”

The Daily Bruin noted that "many elements in the film – particularly during the climax when Rose, Dan and Abra converge in a “shine” to the death – reference recognizable characters and scenes from The Shining.”

Connections to The Shining novel and film 

Doctor Sleep is based on the 2013 novel of the same name by Stephen King. His 1977 novel The Shining was adapted into the 1980 film of the same name directed by Stanley Kubrick. King was critical of Kubrick's film adaptation to the point of writing and executive-producing a new adaptation with the 1997 television miniseries.

While the film Doctor Sleep is intended to be a direct adaptation of the 2013 sequel novel, director Mike Flanagan said Doctor Sleep still "acknowledge[s] Kubrick's The Shining in some way". Flanagan said, "It is an adaptation of the novel Doctor Sleep, which is Stephen King's sequel to his novel, The Shining. But this also exists very much in the same cinematic universe that Kubrick established in his adaptation of The Shining." He explained working with all the sources, "Reconciling those three, at times very different, sources has been kind of the most challenging and thrilling part of this creatively for us." He first read the novel, and then had a conversation with King to work out adapting all the sources. As part of the process, Flanagan recreated scenes from The Shining to use in flashbacks. Same as The Shining, Flanagan also avoided the horror film trope of jump scares.

On why he wanted to present the film as a continuation of Kubrick's film, Flanagan expressed, "The Shining is so ubiquitous and has burned itself into the collective imagination of people who love cinema in a way that so few movies have. There’s no other language to tell that story in. If you say ‘Overlook Hotel,’ I see something. It lives right up in my brain because of Stanley Kubrick. You can't pretend that isn't the case". King is famously known to dislike Kubrick's adaptation of The Shining, particularly due to omitting several aspects of the novel that were personal to him, such as themes related to alcoholism and its role in the disintegration of family, which Flanagan read as "an examination of his fear of what his alcoholism could do to his family... and he wrote himself hope and sacrifice at the end. None of that is present in the Kubrick film... that was a bridge too far of a personal level for him." The opening of the Doctor Sleep novel was seen as King undoing and avoiding the changes Kubrick made to the Shining film.

During early talks, King's two stipulations for the Doctor Sleep adaptation was that the Overlook would not be present, and that the novel's ending would be retained. King initially rejected Flanagan's pitch of bringing back the Overlook as seen in Kubrick's film, but changed his mind after Flanagan pitched a scene within the hotel towards the end of the film that served as his reason to bring back the Overlook. Upon reading the script, King was so satisfied with the result that he said, "Everything that I ever disliked about the Kubrick version of The Shining is redeemed for me here."

Flanagan later revealed that there were two scenes that convinced King to accept his idea. The first was the scene involving Dan talking with The Bartender in the form of Jack, which was not adapted from either novel and was fully written by Flanagan before finishing his first draft. The second was the ending which directly adapts the final act of The Shining novel that was heavily omitted from Kubrick's film, with Dan and Abra taking the place of the novel's Jack and Danny, as well as the Overlook burning down due to the overloaded boiler. Thus, this film can be seen as a bridge for King's Doctor Sleep and The Shining, incorporating events from both novels. Flanagan said that in his film, "Almost everything Dan does [is] Jack's story from [the original novel]" and that he "really wanted to try to bring back the ending from The Shining novel and give it to Dan." In including these elements into the Doctor Sleep film, Flanagan explained, "I saw it as this gift, to me as a fan, and from me to him as well — that yes, we're going to bring back this Kubrickian Overlook world, and I wanted to celebrate that film. But what if, in doing so, at the same time, you get elements of that ending of that novel, The Shining, that Kubrick jettisoned? Then you start to get the ending you never did, and that King was denied."

Production
Warner Bros. Pictures began developing a film adaptation of Doctor Sleep as early as 2014. In 2016, filmmaker Akiva Goldsman announced that he would write and produce the film for Warner Bros. For several years, Warner Bros. could not secure a budget for Doctor Sleep, or for a different project, a prequel to The Shining called Overlook Hotel.

In late 2017, Warner Bros. released It, a film adaptation of King's 1986 novel of the same name, and its box office success led the studio to fast track production of Doctor Sleep. In January 2018, Warner Bros. hired Mike Flanagan to rewrite Goldsman's script and direct the film, with Goldsman receiving executive producer credit. On why he was interested in directing Doctor Sleep, Flanagan stated, "It touches on themes that are the most attractive to me, which are childhood trauma leading into adulthood, addiction, the breakdown of a family, and the after effects, decades later."

From June to November 2018, the cast was assembled. Filming began in September 2018 in the U.S. state of Georgia; locations included Atlanta and St. Simons. In the area of Atlanta, specific locations included Covington, Canton, Stone Mountain, Midtown, Porterdale, and Fayetteville. Production concluded in December 2018. By January 2019, Flanagan was editing the film.

The film score was composed by The Newton Brothers (Andy Grush and Taylor Stewart), who also composed scores for Flanagan's previous works. WaterTower Music has released the film score. The score is heavily inspired by the music of The Shining and includes a reworked rendition of the main theme, Dies Irae.

Vintage music by Al Bowlly, Ray Noble and Henry Hall is also included in the film, reprising the key part it played in “The Shining”. “Home” by Henry Hall & The Gleneagles Hotel Band is available on one release. “And The Bands Played On”. Decca DDV 5001/2. The song was never issued before 1977 and was remastered by Keith Gooden & Geoff Milne at Decca in England.

Release
Doctor Sleep had its world premiere at the Regency Village Theater in Westwood, Los Angeles on October 21, 2019. Warner Bros. They opened the film globally earlier, 2019, coinciding with Halloween. The film was initially scheduled to be released on January 24, 2020. Deadline Hollywood said the rescheduling reflected Warner Bros. giving "a major vote of confidence" in the film.

A director's cut along with the theatrical cut of Doctor Sleep was released on Digital HD on January 21, 2020, and was released on DVD, Blu-ray and 4K on February 4. The director's cut is 28 minutes longer.

Reception

Box office
Doctor Sleep grossed $31.5 million in the United States and Canada, and $40.7 million in other territories, for a worldwide total of $72.2 million.

In the United States and Canada, the film was released alongside Last Christmas, Midway, and Playing with Fire, and was initially projected to gross $25–30 million from 3,855 theaters in its opening weekend. BoxOffice wrote, "Early social and trailer trends are indicative of a potential box office hit should reviews and audience reception prove favorable," but added, "Doctor Sleeps primary barrier to breakout status could be how reliant it is on younger audience familiarity with the source Stephen King novels and/or The Shining." The film made $5.2 million on its first day, including a combined $1.5 million from advanced preview screenings on October 30 and Thursday night previews on November 7, lowering weekend projections to $12 million. It ended up debuting to $14.1 million, getting upset by Midway for the top spot. Deadline Hollywood speculated that despite it being "well-reviewed and well-received" by critics and audiences, the underperformance was due to the 2-hour runtime, as well as the perception the film was meant for older audiences (67% of the opening weekend attendance was over the age of 24).

Following its debut, it was projected the film would lose Warner Bros. around $20 million. In its second weekend the film made $6.0 million, dropping to sixth. Business Insider speculated that, according to box-office experts, Warner Bros. overestimated The Shinings influence among younger audiences, who don't care much about Kubrick's film, as well as the mistake Warner Bros. made to release the film worldwide in November after Halloween.

Critical response

The website's critics consensus reads, "Doctor Sleep forsakes the elemental terror of its predecessor for a more contemplative sequel that balances poignant themes against spine-tingling chills." Metacritic assigned the film a weighted average score of 59 out of 100, based on 46 critics, indicating "mixed or average reviews". Audiences polled by CinemaScore gave the film an average grade of "B+" on an A+ to F scale, while those surveyed at PostTrak gave it an average four out of five, with 60% saying they would definitely recommend it to a friend.

Brian Tallerico of RogerEbert.com gave the film three out of four, stating, "Flanagan was tasked with making a sequel to a film that stays loyal to a book that ignores the changes made in the first movie. That ain't easy... And while one can sometimes feel Flanagan struggling to satisfy both King and Kubrick fans when he really should be trusting his own vision, he's talented enough to pull off this difficult blend of legacies." Simran Hans of The Guardian gave the film four out of five, noting "adapting Stephen King is one thing, writing a spiritual sequel to a Stanley Kubrick movie quite another. Director Mike Flanagan takes on King's 2013 follow-up novel to The Shining, but adjusts some details to ensure continuity with Kubrick's cult 1980 adaptation of the original book... The new material is fresher and considerably more fun."

BBC's critic Nicholas Barber gave the film four out of five and stated, "Credible in its characterisation, rich in mythological detail, and touchingly sincere in its treatment of alcoholism and trauma, the film is impressive in all sorts of ways. But its greatest achievement is that it makes The Shining seem like a prequel—a tantalising glimpse of a richer and more substantial narrative." Chris Hewitt of Empire gave the film three out of five and noted, "Working off source material that is very different from its predecessor, anyone expecting a straightforward Shining sequel will be disappointed. This isn't a gruelling exercise in pure horror. It's odder and more contemplative, but worth checking in." Kyle Smith of National Review wrote "Though Kubrick's adaptation and The Shawshank Redemption are the only films made from King's stories that achieved greatness, nearly everything he writes contains at least one brilliantly twisted element, and Doctor Sleep has lots of them. It's a shame that more top-tier directors haven't chosen to dig around in the capacious mines of King's imagination."

Peter Travers of Rolling Stone gave the film three out of five stars, saying: "Doctor Sleep relies way too much on borrowed inspiration and eventually runs out of—pardon the word—steam. But this flawed hybrid of King and Kubrick still has the stuff to keep you up nights."  Angelica Jade Bastién of Vulture wrote "The film aims in its closing moments to be bittersweet yet hopeful. Instead, it has an unintended, even dour messaging about the cost of escaping your past and whether that's even possible in life. Doctor Sleep could probably never fully stand on its own, and perhaps it's not meant to. It's a horror film with messy pleasures if you're able to meet it on its own level." Todd McCarthy of The Hollywood Reporter stated, "It doesn't have Jack Nicholson, Stanley Kubrick or even much of the Overlook Hotel, but Rebecca Ferguson and other good actors provide some shine of their own in Doctor Sleep, a drawn-out and seldom pulse-quickening follow-up to The Shining that still has enough going on to forestall any audience slumber."

Tim Grierson of Screen Daily commented, "For a horror director, Flanagan is particularly adept with actors, concerned more about character arcs than cheap frights. That's why Doctor Sleeps uninspired plotting feels even more disappointing. Flanagan gives us such a sense of these people—their demons, their fears, their resilience—that it's a shame that the twists and turns aren't as compelling. Not everyone will make it out alive from the Overlook, but Flanagan brings enough smarts and soul to the flawed, fascinating Doctor Sleep that he manages to escape The Shinings shadow mostly unscathed." Michael O'Sullivan of The Washington Post gave the film two stars out of four and wrote "Part homage to Kubrick's moody atmospherics, and part hyper-literal superhero story, Doctor Sleep is stylish, engrossing, at times frustratingly illogical and, ultimately less than profoundly unsettling... Doctor Sleep will by no means make you drowsy, but it won't keep anyone up at night either." Austin Collins of Vanity Fair added "Doctor Sleep is a horror movie, but what's immediately striking is its sudden breadth, it's humble resistance to the usual perils and thrills of blockbuster. It's refreshing. This is a story that feels larger than it is, in part because this story takes the shine and does something with it, reveals it for the tenuous, impermanent, vulnerable force that it is." Michael Roffman of Consequence of Sound mentioned "Doctor Sleep shouldn't work. Even now, the idea of making a big-budget sequel to arguably the greatest horror film of all time reads like a disaster on paper. Yet, to our surprise, Flanagan's execution warrants its existence."

Tom Philip of GQ wrote, "while Flanagan delivers an ending that sort of respects King's book and rhymes with The Shinings filmed conclusion, it all feels quite forced. At its heart, this is a film about a son rejecting his destiny to become his ghoulish father and forge his own path. It's a shame Doctor Sleep doesn't have the guts to do the same." Johnny Oleksinski of New York Post gave the film three out of four and said, "The movie skillfully builds to the tense final sequence, in which writer/director Mike Flanagan has re-created the hotel just as it was in the 1980 film. He even films it in Kubrick's cavernous, blinding manner."

David Sims of The Atlantic said, "Flanagan clearly understands how Kubrick's adaptation eclipsed King's attachment to the original story and became entrenched in the broader culture. But this movie is still just a very good facsimile. Doctor Sleep is wonderfully reverent when it comes to Kubrick's film, but that means it can't escape The Shinings shadow, no matter how much King might have wanted it to." Eric Kohn of IndieWire gave the film a C+ grade, commenting, "... Doctor Sleep shows considerable effort to ingratiate itself to discerning cinephiles, from the moody Newton Brothers score to cinematographer Michael Fimognari's dark blue nighttime palette; as a whole, the movie conjures an eerie and wondrous atmosphere that blends abject terror with a somber, mournful quality unique to Flanagan's oeuvre. But his pandering to dueling source material results in a jagged puzzle beneath both of their standards". Alison Foreman of Mashable stated, "Doctor Sleep could have tried to be The Shinings sequel, an intimidated son yearning to be like his father. Instead, it's entirely new... Doctor Sleep isn't The Shining, but it does shine." Justin Chang of Los Angeles Times wrote, "You can't blame Flanagan for fetishizing the visual iconography of Kubrick's movie, for plunging back into his funhouse of horrors like the proverbial kid in a candy store. But the effect can't help but fundamentally alter the tone and intent of Doctor Sleep, briefly transforming a richly disturbing fantasy into an extravagant act of fan service. It taps into the minutiae of Kubrick's masterwork without fully teasing out its mystery."

Accolades

Future
Prior to the film's release, Warner Bros. had enough confidence in the film that they hired Flanagan to script a prequel with the working title Hallorann, focusing on the character of Dick Hallorann. Following the disappointing box-office performance of Doctor Sleep, the future of the project was cancelled.

Flanagan also confirmed that he was interested in directing a sequel focused on Abra Stone, and that he had asked King, who was open to the idea.

See also
Psychic vampire
List of adaptations of works by Stephen King
List of vampire films

References

External links
 
 

2010s ghost films
2010s supernatural horror films
2019 horror films
2019 films
American buddy films
American ghost films
American road movies
American supernatural horror films
American vampire films
American sequel films
Astral projection in popular culture
Films set in 1980
Films set in 2011
Films set in 2019
Films about alcoholism
Films about cults
Films about psychic powers
Films about child death
Films based on American horror novels
Films based on works by Stephen King
Films directed by Mike Flanagan
Films scored by the Newton Brothers
Films set in Colorado
Films set in Florida
Films set in hotels
Films set in Iowa
Films set in New Hampshire
Films set in New Jersey
Films shot in Atlanta
The Shining (franchise)
Vertigo Entertainment films
Warner Bros. films
2010s English-language films
2010s American films

ja:ドクター・スリープ#映画